Hug Radio 93.3 (DYJS 93.3 MHz) is an FM station in the Philippines, owned and operated by Vimcontu Broadcasting Corporation. Its studios and transmitter are located at Central Nautical Highway, Bogo, Cebu.

References

External links
Hug Radio FB Page

Radio stations in Cebu
Radio stations established in 2013